Darko is a common Slavic given name, and an Akan family name.

People:
 Darko (given name)
 Darko (surname)

Places:
 Velké Dářko, a pond in the Czech Republic

Movies:
 Donnie Darko, a 2001 film by Richard Kelly starring Jake Gyllenhaal and Jena Malone
 S. Darko, a 2009 film, sequel to Donnie Darko

Music:
 Darko US, an American deathcore, electronica, ambient and progressive metal band
 Darko, the debut studio album by Darko US